Conrad Castro Poe (April 11, 1948 – June 26, 2010) was a Filipino actor, and half-brother of Fernando Poe Jr.

Early life
He was born on April 11, 1948 to Fernando Poe Sr. and former leading lady Patricia Mijares. He was a paternal half-brother to Elizabeth Poe, Fernando Poe Jr., Andy Poe, and Freddie Poe.

Personal life
He was married to housewife Zenaida Marcelo-Poe. He died of heart disease and stroke.

Filmography

Film

Writer

Death
The late Fernando Poe, Jr.’s low-key half-brother-actor Conrad Poe died on the morning of June 26, 2010, in his home in Meycauayan City, Bulacan. He was 62. Conrad had been nursing a heart disease before suffering a fatal stroke before dawn on Saturday.

References

1948 births
2010 deaths
20th-century Filipino male actors
21st-century Filipino male actors
Filipino male child actors
Filipino male film actors
Filipino people of Catalan descent
Filipino Roman Catholics
Kapampangan people
Male actors from Manila
People from Meycauayan
People from Pampanga
Conrad